The Kanjiroba Himal is an isolated part of the Himalaya range within Nepal, adjacent to the Tibetan border.

The region remained unmapped until the 1950s, when British explorer John Baird Tyson made the first of a series of expeditions to the area.

The highest peak is Kanjiroba with a summit elevation of 6,883 meters above sea level.

Location
Kanjiroba Himal is within the cross-border Shey Phoksundo National Park, Dolpa district, Nepal about 180 kilometres north-west of Pokhara city.

Geology
The region is high mountains, cut into by glaciers and deep, precipitous river valleys.

Communications
Limited to the valleys, there are no practicable routes across the high mountains into Tibet

References

External links
 Expedition report

Geography of Nepal
Himalayas
Mountains of the Karnali Province